The Record of the Year was an award voted by the United Kingdom public. For many years it was given in conjunction with television programmes of the same name. The first show ran in the early evening on a December Saturday just before Christmas with the ten finalists represented as either live performances or filmed inserts or dance routines; then the phone lines were declared opened and the second show, an hour or so later, at prime time and also live, went around the TV regions revealing the votes and culminating in the announcement of the winner.

It became one of the highest rated music TV ceremonies in the UK, boosting sales of CDs and then downloads in the crucial fortnight before Christmas every year. For that reason, it was much respected by the industry, labels, publishers and retailers. It was the only music award in the UK to be chosen by the public.

The award began in 1998 and was televised on ITV for eight years before being dropped in 2006 after disagreements over the phone voting element. Since then, it had been an online poll, administered through the Record of the Year website. In 2013, the online poll was axed, signaling the end of the award.

Winners
The most frequent winner was Irish boy band Westlife, with four awards (1999, 2000, 2003 and 2005), two of which were consecutive. The only other artist to win multiple awards was American singer Lady Gaga, with two awards (2009 and 2011).

The 2008 winner, "Rockstar" by Canadian band Nickelback, was the first winner from North America.

The only artist to receive multiple nominations in the same year was American rapper Pitbull, who was nominated as both a lead and featured artist in 2011, although he never won.

Year by year

1998
Presenter: Denise van Outen

The ten finalists were:

1999
Presenter: Denise van Outen

The ten finalists were:

2000
Presenter: Denise van Outen

The ten finalists were:

2001
Presenters: Ant & Dec

The ten finalists were:

2002
Presenters: Ant & Dec

The ten finalists were:

2003
Presenter: Cat Deeley

The ten finalists were:

2004
Presenter: Cat Deeley

The ten finalists were:

2005
Presenter: Vernon Kay

The ten finalists were:

2006
The result was:

2007
The result was:

2008
The result was:

2009
The result was:

2010
The result was:

2011
The result was:

2012
The result was:

Criticism and praise
Many have criticised the 'Record of the Year' Award, as they feel the nominations are unfairly dominated by pop acts and thus the winner is usually not the "true" record of the year. One suggested reason for this is that it is done to attract young girls, who the organisers are sure will watch the televised final and vote for the records. Others have argued that it is an attempt to boost the sales of pop artists' albums, which traditionally have limited success relative to their singles, in the crucial pre-Christmas period. Of the examples cited as evidence for this, the most famous include the exclusion of rap artist Eminem's "My Name Is..." in 1999 as he was unavailable to perform live on the Record of the Year final and the omission from nominations of rock act The Darkness's track "I Believe in a Thing Called Love" in 2003 despite being one of the highest selling singles of the year.

In spite of this, many winners of the award, as well as the organisers, argue its significance and integrity on the basis that it represents the views of the public, rather than critics. It inspired Simon Cowell to get into television and he attributes the show for his entry into the media. Some may argue this is not entirely a good thing. However, it always gets massive ratings. Indeed, Westlife have often said that their first win for the single "Flying Without Wings" was the most exciting moment in their career. Unsurprisingly, critics eventually began to say that it was just an award to prove Westlife were still around, hence why Heat Magazine dubbed it "Westlife Record of the Year" in 2004. However, a counter-argument is that this, and similar awards based on phone polls, are a true representation of public opinion, a possibly better indication than sales, which calls BBC Radio 1's countdown of the 20 best selling singles of the last calendar year a more accurate indication of the record of the year. Still, the chosen tracks on the televised Record of the Year contest reflect the views of the television programme viewers only, and not necessarily the music-buying public at large, who might not phone in multiple times to vote for their favourite song.  In contrast, the Radio 1 end-of-year chart includes all music sales in all formats.

Sponsorship
Below is a list of companies that have sponsored the award since it began:

 1998–2001: Britannia Music
 2002–2005: T-Mobile

Theme music
From 1998 to 2004, the theme music was the club track "Disco Cop" by Blue Adonis. In 2005, ITV used a specially recorded track.

References

British music awards
ITV (TV network) original programming
Annual events in the United Kingdom
1998 establishments in the United Kingdom
Awards established in 1998
2012 disestablishments in the United Kingdom
Awards disestablished in 2012